David Lamont Long Jr. (born October 12, 1996) is an American football linebacker for the Miami Dolphins of the National Football League (NFL). He played college football at West Virginia.

Early life
When Long was seven years old, he was on the back of a bike being pedaled by his older brother when he was hit by a car driven by someone who was not paying attention. He was treated at the hospital with head and arm injuries. He attended Winton Woods High School in Cincinnati and finished his career with 283 career tackles, six sacks, and six interceptions. Long was a high school teammate of safety Mike Edwards, who was drafted by the Tampa Bay Buccaneers in the third round of the 2019 NFL Draft.

College career

Long redshirted in 2015 and made his collegiate debut as a redshirt freshman for the 2016 team in the season-opener against Missouri on September 3 with four tackles as a reserve.

Long missed the first month of the season due to a summer knee injury.  As a redshirt sophomore for the 2017 Mountaineers, his best statistics were his 18-tackle (including a school record 7 for a loss (meaning the offense lost yardage as a result of his tackle)) effort against the Oklahoma State Cowboys on October 28 and his 2.5-quarterback sack performance in the December 26, 2017 Heart of Dallas Bowl against the Utah Utes.

Among his best games as a redshirt junior for the 2018 team were his 15-tackle (3 for a loss) effort against Texas Tech on September 29 and his 3-sack performance on November 10 against TCU. That season, he was named as a 2018 first-team All-Big 12 selection and as the Big 12 Defensive Player of the Year, after leading the Big 12 in tackles for a loss. Long is the second Mountaineer to be named a conference defensive MVP (Canute Curtis, 1996 Big East), and first since the Mountaineers joined the Big 12. Long earned 2018 College Football All-America Team second-team recognition by the Walter Camp Football Foundation, and the Associated Press.  On December 30, 2018, Long announced that he would forgo his final year of eligibility and declare for the 2019 NFL Draft.

Professional career

Tennessee Titans
Long was drafted by the Tennessee Titans in the sixth round (188th overall) of the 2019 NFL Draft. During Week 10 against the Kansas City Chiefs, Long forced a fumble off running back Damien Williams which was recovered by teammate Rashaan Evans for a 53-yard touchdown in the 35–32 win.

Long was placed on the reserve/COVID-19 list by the team on November 16, 2020, and activated on November 28.

Long entered the 2022 season as the starting linebacker for the Titans. He suffered a hamstring injury in Week 13 and was placed on injured reserve on December 10, 2022.

Miami Dolphins
On March 17, 2023, Long signed a two-year, $11 million contract with the Miami Dolphins.

NFL statistics

Personal life
David’s father, David Sr., is a former professional boxer who went 12-5-2 as a heavyweight. He once fought future world champ Deontay Wilder.

References

External links
 Titans bio
 West Virginia profile
 Long at ESPN

1996 births
Living people
Players of American football from Cincinnati
American football linebackers
West Virginia Mountaineers football players
Tennessee Titans players
Miami Dolphins players